"For What It's Worth (Stop, Hey What's That Sound)" (often referred to as simply "For What It's Worth") is a song written by Stephen Stills. Performed by Buffalo Springfield, it was recorded on December 5, 1966, released as a single on Atco Records in December1966 and peaked at No. 7 on the Billboard Hot 100 chart in the spring of 1967.

It was later added to the March 1967 second pressing of their first album, Buffalo Springfield. The title was added after the song was written, and does not appear in the lyrics.

In 2004 Rolling Stone magazine ranked the song at number 63 on its list of the 500 Greatest Songs of All Time.

Background
Although "For What It's Worth" is often considered an anti-war song, Stephen Stills was inspired to write the song because of the Sunset Strip curfew riots in Los Angeles in November 1966, a series of early counterculture-era clashes that took place between police and young people on the Sunset Strip in Hollywood, California, the same year Buffalo Springfield had become the house band at the Whisky a Go Go. Local residents and businesses had become annoyed by how crowds of young people going to clubs and music venues along the Strip had caused late-night traffic congestion. In response, they lobbied Los Angeles County to pass local ordinances stopping loitering, and enforced a strict curfew on the Strip after 10 p.m. The young music fans, however, felt the new laws infringed upon their civil rights.

On Saturday, November 12, 1966, fliers were distributed on the Sunset Strip inviting people to join demonstrations later that day. Several of Los Angeles's rock radio stations also announced a rally outside the Pandora's Box club on the corner of Sunset Boulevard and Crescent Heights. That evening, as many as 1,000 young demonstrators, including future celebrities such as Jack Nicholson and Peter Fonda (who was handcuffed by police) gathered to protest against the curfew's enforcement. Although the rallies began peacefully, trouble eventually broke out. The unrest continued the next night, and periodically throughout the rest of November and December, forcing some clubs to shut down within weeks. It was against the background of these civil disturbances that Stills recorded "For What It's Worth" on December 5, 1966.

Cash Box said the single is a "throbbing, infectious protester circling 'round the current happenings in Cal."

Production
Stills said in an interview that the name of the song came about when he presented it to the record company executive Ahmet Ertegun (who signed Buffalo Springfield to the Atlantic Records-owned ATCO label). Stills said "I have this song here, for what it's worth, if you want it."  Another producer, Charlie Greene, claims that Stills first said the above line to him, but credits Ahmet Ertegun with giving the single the parenthetical subtitle "Stop, Hey What's That Sound" in order that the song would be more easily recognized.

The song was recorded on December 5, 1966, at Columbia Studios, Hollywood. Tom Dowd claimed he mixed the song at Atlantic's studio in New York, though this has been disputed. Dowd did take part in the production of Cher's version of the song in 1969. One of the most recognizable elements of the song is Neil Young's use of guitar harmonics.

Legacy
"For What It's Worth" quickly became a well-known protest song. However, contrary to popular belief, the song was not motivated by the Vietnam War, but rather a confrontation Stills had in Los Angeles' Sunset Strip neighborhood. In 2006, when interviewed on Tom Kent's radio show Into the '70s, Stills pointed out that many people think the song is about the Kent State shootings of 1970, even though its release predates that event by over three years. Neil Young—Stills's bandmate in both Buffalo Springfield and Crosby, Stills, Nash & Young (CSNY)—would later write "Ohio" in response to the events at Kent State.

An all-star version of "For What It's Worth", with Tom Petty and others, was played at Buffalo Springfield's induction into the Rock and Roll Hall of Fame in 1997; Neil Young did not attend the event.

The song is a staple of period piece films about 1960s America and the Vietnam War, such as Forrest Gump, and often used as a common shorthand to quickly establish the atmosphere of 1960s counterculture movement and protests.

The song appears in the intro to the 2005 film Lord of War, showing the lifecycle of a bullet, from manufacture to firing.

On August 17, 2020, Billy Porter sang "For What It's Worth" for the 2020 Democratic National Convention backed by Stephen Stills on guitar, a nod to the song's resurgent use in the summer 2020 American protests.

Charts

Weekly charts

Year-end charts

Certifications

Covers and sampling
"For What It's Worth" has been covered, sampled, and referenced in numerous musical performances. Versions include those by the Staple Singers (US #66 in 1967)(CAN #46 in 1967), Art (1967 single from Supernatural Fairy Tales), Ken Lyon & Tombstone, Rush, Cher, the Candyskins, Oui 3 (UK #28), Queensrÿche (on their album Take Cover), Miriam Makeba (on her album Keep Me in Mind), Ozzy Osbourne and (həd) p.e. (retitled Children). Cher's 1969 cover did not make the Billboard Hot 100; AllMusic retrospectively called her version "mature [and] forceful".

Sergio Mendes and Brasil'66 recorded a version of this song. It reached #10 in the Adult Contemporary Music Chart on September 19, 1970. Singer Karen Philipp suggested to Sergio that he should cover the song. Karen does all of the vocals for this song by overdubbing. Two versions of this song exist: The mono 45 has a more extreme overdubbing of Karen's vocals with a different organ solo than the LP. The LP version is in stereo with a different vocal arrangement.

David Cassidy recorded an extended live version for his 1974 album Cassidy Live! (Bell Records, UK #9; recorded live in Great Britain in May 1974).

In 1998, Les Rythmes Digitales released a version under the title "(Hey You) What's That Sound?", a track from their album Darkdancer.

On episode 2.21 of The Muppet Show, originally airing 19 February 1978, "For What It's Worth" is performed by an opossum (Jerry Nelson) and a chorus of woodland animals. The third verse is rewritten by an uncredited writer to give the song an anti-hunting theme.

The hip-hop group Public Enemy sampled "For What It's Worth" on their 1998 song "He Got Game", which featured Stephen Stills reprising his vocal performance from the original song. Oui 3 adapted the song for their 1993 debut single of the same name, which reached number 26 in the UK chart.
In 2017, Haley Reinhart released a cover of the song as the third single from her third studio album, What's That Sound? In 2018, the Lone Bellow released a cover of the song as a single. In 2022 Stevie Nicks released a cover of it as well, not to be confused with her 2011 song of the same name.

See also
 List of 1960s one-hit wonders in the United States
 Protest songs in the United States

Notes

References

External links
 Reasontorock analysis of song

1966 songs
1967 singles
1969 singles
Atco Records singles
Buffalo Springfield songs
Cher songs
Grammy Hall of Fame Award recipients
Protest songs
Songs about California
Songs written by Stephen Stills
Song recordings produced by Arif Mardin
Song recordings produced by Tom Dowd
Song recordings produced by Jerry Wexler